Benedetto Brin was a  pre-dreadnought battleship built for the Italian Regia Marina between 1899 and 1905. Benedetto Brin saw combat in the Italo-Turkish War of 1911–1912, including the bombardment of Tripoli in October 1911. She was destroyed by an internal explosion during World War I in September 1915, which killed over 450 of the ship's crew.

Design

The ship had a flush deck and an inverted bow with a ram below the waterline. Benedetto Brin had a crew of 812 officers and enlisted men.

Her propulsion system consisted of two triple expansion steam engines that drove a pair of screw propellers. Steam for the engines was provided by twenty-eight coal-fired Belleville boilers, which were vented into three funnels, two of which were placed side by side.

As built, the ship was armed with a main battery of four  40-caliber guns placed in two twin gun turrets, one forward and one aft. The ship was also equipped with a secondary battery of four  40-cal. guns in casemates in the superstructure, and twelve  40-cal. guns, also in casemates in the side of the hull. Close-range defense against torpedo boats was provided by a battery of twenty  40-cal. guns. The ship also carried a pair of  guns, two  guns, and two  Maxim guns. Benedetto Brin was also equipped with four  torpedo tubes placed in the hull below the waterline.

The ship was protected with Harvey steel manufactured in Terni. The conning tower and the casemate guns were also protected by 152 mm of armor plating. The main battery guns had stronger armor protection, at 203 mm thick.

Service
The ship was built by the Castellammare di Stabia shipyard. Her keel was laid down on 30 January 1899, and the completed hull was launched on 7 November 1901 in the presence of the King and Queen of Italy, government officials, and the whole Italian Mediterranean squadron. Fitting out work lasted for the next four years, and she was completed on 1 September 1905. It took so long primarily because of non-delivery of material, particularly the heavy armor. After she entered active service, the ship was assigned to the Mediterranean Squadron. The Squadron was usually only activated for seven months of the year in peacetime, which was occupied with training maneuvers, and the rest of the year the ships were placed in reserve. In 1907, the Mediterranean Squadron consisted of Benedetto Brin, her sister , and three of the s. The ships participated in the annual maneuvers in late September and early October, under the command of Vice Admiral Alfonso di Brocchetti. Benedetto Brin remained in the active duty squadron through 1910, by which time the fourth Regina Elena-class ship was completed, bringing the total number of front-line battleships to six.

Italo-Turkish War

On 29 September 1911, Italy declared war on the Ottoman Empire in order to seize Libya. During the Italo-Turkish War Benedetto Brin was assigned to the 1st Division of the 2nd Squadron, along with her sister and the two s. Benedetto Brin served as the squadron flagship of Vice Admiral Farvelli. In early October, she arrived off Tripoli to relieve  on blockade duty outside the port. On 3–4 October, she participated in the bombardment of the fortifications protecting Tripoli. The Italian fleet used their medium-caliber guns to preserve their ammunition for the heavy guns. Turkish counter-battery fire was completely ineffective.

On 13 April 1912, Benedetto Brin and the rest of the Squadron sailed from Tobruk to the Aegean Sea to rendezvous with the 1st Squadron. The two squadrons met off Stampalia on 17 April. The next day, the fleet steamed into the northern Aegean and cut several Turkish submarine telegraph cables. Most of the ships of the Italian fleet then bombarded the fortresses protecting the Dardanelles in an unsuccessful attempt to lure out the Turkish fleet. While they were doing this, Regina Margherita, Benedetto Brin, and two torpedo boats were detached to cut additional cables between Rhodes and Marmaris. In July, Benedetto Brin and the rest of the division had withdrawn to Italy to replace worn-out gun barrels, along with other repairs. Also in 1912, the ship had four 3-inch guns added, increasing her battery from 20 to 24 pieces.

World War I
Italy declared neutrality after the outbreak of World War I in August 1914, but by April 1915, the Triple Entente had convinced the Italians to enter the war against the Central Powers which it did in May. The primary naval opponent for the duration of the war was the Austro-Hungarian Navy; the Naval Chief of Staff, Admiral Paolo Thaon di Revel, planned a distant blockade with the battle fleet, while smaller vessels, such as the MAS boats conducted raids. The heavy ships of the Italian fleet would be preserved for a potential major battle should the Austro-Hungarian fleet emerge from its bases. As a result, the ship's career during the war was limited. In addition to the cautious Italian strategy, Benedetto Brin—long-since obsolescent—was reduced to a training ship in the 3rd Division, along with her sister ship. On 27 September 1915, Benedetto Brin was destroyed in a huge explosion in the harbor of Brindisi. At the time, the explosion was believed to have been the result of Austro-Hungarian sabotage. The Italian Navy now believes the explosion to have been accidental. A total of 8 officers and 379 enlisted men survived but 454 members of the crew, including Rear Admiral Ernesto Rubin de Cervin died. Two of the ship's 12-inch guns (those in the frontal gun turret) were salvaged from the wreck and were reused as coastal guns protecting Venice.

Footnotes

Notes

Citations

References

Further reading

External links

 Benedetto Brin (1901) Marina Militare website

Regina Margherita-class battleships
World War I battleships of Italy
Maritime incidents in 1915
Ships sunk by non-combat internal explosions
World War I shipwrecks in the Adriatic Sea
Shipwrecks of Italy
1905 ships
Ships built in Castellammare di Stabia